Lieutenant General Thomas C. Waskow is a retired United States Air Force officer who last served as Commander, United States Forces Japan and Commander, 5th Air Force from November 2001 to April 2005. 
During that assignment, he was the senior U.S. military representative in Japan and Commander of U.S. Air Force units in Japan.

Waskow received his commission upon graduation from the U.S. Air Force Academy in 1970, and he served as a forward air controller and instructor pilot early in his career. During the Vietnam War, he was assigned as a forward air controller at Ban Me Thout and Tan Son Nhut, Vietnam, where he flew 282 combat missions over South Vietnam and Cambodia. Selected to fly the F-15 Eagle early in its operational deployment, he has flown all models and variants of the air-to-air F-15. He has held command at all levels—fighter squadron, wing and numbered air force. Prior to assuming his final position, he was director of air and space operations, Headquarters Pacific Air Forces. On September 11, 2001, he was designated the Area Air Defense Commander for the Hawaii Air Defense Region and was responsible for the air sovereignty of the state of Hawaii.

Waskow is a command pilot with more than 4,700 flying hours, including 904 combat hours and more than 2,200 hours in the F-15 Eagle. In addition to significant combat experience in Vietnam, Waskow commanded the 42nd Air Base Wing at Maxwell Air Force Base. Waskow contributed extensively to contingency operations Deny Flight and Silver Wake in the Balkans, Noble Eagle in Hawaii in 2001, and Unified Assistance in Japan in 2005.

Education
1970 Bachelor of Science degree in aeronautical engineering, U.S. Air Force Academy, Colorado Springs, Colorado 
1978 Master of Science degree in business, Central Michigan University, Mount Pleasant 
1985 Air War College, Maxwell Air Force Base, Alabama 
1987 National War College, Fort Lesley J. McNair, Washington, D.C. 
1988 Senior Executive Fellow, Harvard University, Cambridge, Massachusetts 
1988 Seminar XXI Fellow, Massachusetts Institute of Technology, Cambridge

Military assignments
 July 1970 – November 1971, student, undergraduate pilot training, 3576th Student Squadron, Vance Air Force Base, Oklahoma
 November 1971 – December 1972, forward air controller, 21st Tactical Air Support Squadron, Tan Son Nhut Air Base, South Vietnam
 December 1972 – March 1974, instructor pilot, 52nd Flying Training Squadron, Craig Air Force Base, Alabama
 March 1974 – September 1976, class commander and academic instructor, 29th Student Squadron, Craig Air Force Base, Alabama
 September 1976 – July 1977, chief, Social Actions, 29th Flying Training Wing, Craig Air Force Base, Alabama
 July 1977 – April 1979, Air Staff Training Program officer, Deputy Chief of Staff for Plans and Programs, Headquarters U.S. Air Force, Washington, D.C.
 April 1979 – July 1982, F-15A instructor pilot, later, executive officer, flight commander and assistant operations officer, 525th Tactical Fighter Squadron, Bitburg Air Base, West Germany
 July 1982 – June 1983, operations officer, 22nd Tactical Fighter Squadron, Bitburg Air Base, West Germany
 June 1983 – November 1983, F-15 instructor pilot, 555th Tactical Fighter Squadron, Luke Air Force Base, Arizona
 November 1983 – June 1984, F-15 operations officer, 426th Tactical Fighter Training Squadron, Luke Air Force Base, Arizona
 June 1984 – July 1986, commander, 550th Tactical Fighter Squadron, Luke Air Force Base, Arizona
 July 1986 – June 1987, student, National War College, Fort Lesley J. McNair, Washington, D.C.
 June 1987 – July 1989, chief of Long-Range Strategic Plans Branch, J-5, Office of the Joint Chiefs of Staff, the Pentagon, Washington, D.C.
 July 1989 – July 1990, vice commander of 18th Tactical Fighter Wing, Kadena Air Base, Japan
 July 1990 – June 1992, deputy chief of staff for operations, Headquarters 5th Air Force, Yokota Air Base, Japan
 June 1992 – December 1993, special assistant to the Commander of Supreme Headquarters Allied Powers Europe, Belgium
 January 1994 – August 1994, chief of staff, Partnership for Peace Coordination Cell, Mons, Belgium
 August 1994 – May 1996, commander of 42nd Air Base Wing (previously the 502nd Air Base Wing), Maxwell Air Force Base, Alabama
 May 1996 – August 1998, chief of staff, Headquarters Allied Air Forces Southern Europe, Naples, Italy
 August 1998 – May 1999, commander of 13th Air Force, Andersen Air Force Base, Guam
 May 1999 – November 2001, director of air and space operations, Headquarters Pacific Air Forces, Hickam Air Force Base, Hawaii
 November 2001 – April 2005, commander of U.S. Forces Japan, and Commander, 5th Air Force, Yokota Air Base, Japan

Effective dates of promotion

References 

Living people
1947 births
Recipients of the Legion of Merit
United States Air Force generals
United States Air Force Academy alumni